Mundari may refer to:

 Mundari people, a nation native to southern Sudan
 Mandari language, their language
 Mundari language, a language spoken by the Munda people of India

See also
 Mundare

Language and nationality disambiguation pages